A referendum on gambling was held in New Zealand on 9 March 1949. Voters were asked whether off-course betting on horse races should be allowed. It was approved, with 68% in favour. Voter turnout was 54.3%. The referendum was held in conjunction with the 1949 New Zealand licensing hours referendum.

Results

References

New Zealand
Gambling referendum
Referendums in New Zealand
Gambling referendums
March 1949 events in New Zealand